is a French  (comedic police crime drama) television program consisting of two series based loosely on Agatha Christie's works of detective fiction, first broadcast on France 2 on 9 January 2009. In English-speaking countries, Series One is titled "The Little Murders of Agatha Christie" and Series Two is titled "Agatha Christie's Criminal Games". Series Two is set in the mid-1950s through early 1960s with Commissaire Swan Laurence (Samuel Labarthe), journalist Alice Avril (Blandine Bellavoir), and Laurence's secretary, Marlène Leroy (Élodie Frenck). Series One streams with English subtitles in the United States on Acorn TV and  MHz Choice, Series Two streams with English subtitles in the United States on MHz Choice and in Australia on SBS. The thirty-eight episodes to the end of Series Two include adaptations of thirty-six of Christie's works.

A third series, with a new cast and set in 1970s France, was announced in 2019. Although the title bearing Christie's name will remain, most of the planned episodes will be original stories "in the spirit of Christie's works" because the producer felt that the remaining books would be "too difficult to adapt", or because of rights issues in some cases.

Series One: 1930s France (2009–2012)

Overview 
Set in northern France in the 1930s, womanising and bombastic Commissaire Jean Larosière and his hapless junior officer Inspecteur Émile Lampion unravel a series of complicated murder cases to reveal the killers.

Cast and characters

Main 
 Antoine Duléry as Commissaire Jean Larosière (11 episodes)
 Marius Colucci as Inspecteur Émile Lampion (11 episodes)

Support 
 Serge Dubois as police officer Ménard (9 episodes)
 Olivier Carré as medical examiner Dr Verdure (5 episodes)

Episodes

Series Two: mid-1950s to 1960s France (2013–2020)

Overview 
The action has moved to mid-1950s to 1960s Lille, France. Suave, razor-sharp, arrogant, and intolerant – Commissaire Swan Laurence investigates murders with the often unappreciated assistance of reporter Alice Avril and police secretary Marlène Leroy.

Cast and characters

Main 
 Samuel Labarthe as Commissaire Swan Laurence (27 episodes)
 Blandine Bellavoir as  journalist and feminist Alice Avril (27 episodes)
 Élodie Frenck as Laurence's Marilyn Monroe-esque police secretary Marlène Leroy (27 episodes)

Support 
 Dominique Thomas as  Ernest Tricard (27 episodes)
 Marie Berto as secretary then police officer Arlette Carmouille (5 episodes)
 Cyril Gueï as medical examiner Dr Timothée Glissant (13 episodes)
 Christophe Piret / François Godart as newspaper editor Robert Jourdeuil (2 / 15 episodes)
 Natacha Lindinger as medical examiner Dr Euphrasie Maillol (4 episodes)
 Éric Beauchamp as police "cop" Martin (16 episodes)
 Bubulle as Marlène's goldfish Bubulle (27 episodes)

Episodes

Series Three: 1970s France (announced 2019, to begin in 2021) 
A third series, with a new cast and set in France in the 1970s, was announced in 2019.

The first and third episodes will be adaptations of, respectively, Endless Night and The Hollow. The second and fourth episodes, as well as the fifth and sixth episodes planned for 2022, will all be original stories; according to the producer, they will be in the "spirit of Agatha Christie".

Notes 

A distinct four-part mini-series, "", adapted from Hercule Poirot's Christmas, was released in 2006. Although Larosière and Lampion are the main characters (played by the same actors), this mini-series is not a prequel or sequel to the later series.
Laurence drives a Facel Vega Facellia FA red Bordeaux coupe.

Complete cast

See also 

 List of French television series

References

External links
 
Les Petits Meurtres d'Agatha Christie on "The Home of Agatha Christie"

2009 French television series debuts
2000s French television series
2010s French television series
French crime television series
French-language television shows
Television shows based on works by Agatha Christie